Shirley Henderson (born 24 November 1965) is a Scottish actress. Her accolades include two Scottish BAFTAs, a VFCC Award and an Olivier Award, as well as BAFTA, BIFA, London Critics' Circle, Chlotrudis, Gotham, and Canadian Screen Award nominations. 

Henderson's film roles include Gail in Trainspotting (1996) and its 2017 sequel, Jude in the Bridget Jones films (2001–2016), and Moaning Myrtle in Harry Potter and the Chamber of Secrets (2002) and Harry Potter and the Goblet of Fire (2005). Her other notable credits include Rob Roy (1995), Wonderland (1999),
Topsy-Turvy (1999), 24 Hour Party People (2002), Wilbur Wants to Kill Himself (2002), Intermission (2003), American Cousins (2003), Frozen (2005), Marie Antoinette (2006), Miss Pettigrew Lives for a Day (2008), Life During Wartime (2009), Meek's Cutoff (2010), Anna Karenina (2012), Filth (2013), Okja (2017), Never Steady, Never Still (2017), and Stan & Ollie (2018). 

Henderson starred as Isobel Sutherland in the BBC series Hamish Macbeth (1995–97) and played Frances Drummond in the BBC drama Happy Valley (2016). She was nominated for RTS Awards for the BBC miniseries The Way We Live Now (2001) and the ITV television film Dirty Filthy Love (2004), and received a BAFTA nomination for her portrayal of Claire Salter in the Channel 4 miniseries Southcliffe (2013). She won the 2018 Olivier Award for Best Actress in a Musical for her role as Elizabeth in the original Old Vic production of Girl from the North Country.

Early life
Henderson was born on 24 November 1965 in Forres, Moray, and grew up in Kincardine-on-Forth, on the north shore of the Firth of Forth, in Fife. She attended Dunfermline High School. As a child, she began singing in local clubs, at charity events, holiday camps and even a boxing contest. At age 16, Henderson completed a one-year course at Adam Smith College, resulting in a National Certificate in Theatre Arts. At 17, she moved to London, where she spent three years at the Guildhall School of Music and Drama, graduating in 1986.

Career

Henderson's first television performance was in the leading role of Elizabeth Findlay in the 1987 ITV children's television drama Shadow of the Stone, for which she was cast by Leonard White. Having appeared in theatrical productions in Scotland in 1986 and 1987, she was directed by Peter Hall at the Royal National Theatre as Fanny Lock in Entertaining Strangers from October 1987 to March 1988, and as Perdita in The Winter's Tale from April to November 1988.

In 1990, she played the title role in Eurydice at the Chichester Festival, and also appeared on television in Wish Me Luck and Casualty. She landed the key role of Isobel in the popular BBC series Hamish Macbeth in 1995.

Henderson then moved into films, playing Morag in Rob Roy (1995) and Spud's girlfriend Gail in Danny Boyle's Trainspotting (1996). She continued her work in the theatre, including many productions at the National Theatre in London. The next year, she appeared in Mike Leigh's Topsy-Turvy, in which she demonstrated her singing skills, and Michael Winterbottom's Wonderland.

Henderson played Jude in all three Bridget Jones films and Moaning Myrtle in Harry Potter and the Chamber of Secrets (2002) and Harry Potter and the Goblet of Fire (2005). She co-starred in the British film Close Your Eyes (2002) along with Goran Višnjić and Miranda Otto and played French princess Sophie-Philippine in Sofia Coppola's Marie Antoinette (2006).

She played the school matron in Nick Moore's 2008 film Wild Child.

Small-screen appearances have included playing Marie Melmotte in The Way We Live Now (2001); Catherine of Braganza in Charles II: The Power and The Passion (2003); Charlotte in Dirty Filthy Love (2004); Ursula Blake in the Doctor Who episode "Love & Monsters" (2006); Emmeline Fox in The Crimson Petal and the White (2011); DS Angela Young in Death in Paradise (2011); and Meg Hawkins in Treasure Island (2012). She played Karen, the lead role, opposite John Simm in Channel 4's Everyday and Meme Kartosov in Anna Karenina.

In 2022, HBO Max announced that Henderson would star in Dune: The Sisterhood as Tula Harkonnen.  However, in early 2023, director Johan Renck and Henderson were reported to have exited the production due to a "creative shift" and production delays.

Filmography

Film

Television

Theatre

Awards and nominations

References

External links

Shirley Henderson at Hamilton Hodell Talent Management

1965 births
Living people
20th-century Scottish actresses
21st-century Scottish actresses
Alumni of the Guildhall School of Music and Drama
People from Kincardine, Fife
People from Moray
Scottish film actresses
Scottish radio actresses
Scottish Shakespearean actresses
Scottish stage actresses
Scottish television actresses
Scottish voice actresses
People educated at Dunfermline High School